Martín Cuevas and Pablo Cuevas were the defending champions and successfully defended their title, defeating Nicolás Jarry and Gonzalo Lama in the final, 6–2, 6–4.

Seeds

Draw

References
 Main Draw

Uruguay Open - Doubles
Uruguay Open